War Sonata may refer to:

 One of three sonatas by Sergei Prokofiev
 Piano Sonata No. 6 (Prokofiev) (1940)
 Piano Sonata No. 7 (Prokofiev) (1942)
 Piano Sonata No. 8 (Prokofiev) (1944)
 Piano Sonata No. 2 (Kabalevsky) (1945), by Dmitry Kabalevsky
 Ninth Sonata in A minor, Op. 30 (circa 1914-1917), by Nikolai Medtner
 Sonate (D-Dur) (Kriegssonate) für Klavier, Op. 19, by Botho Sigwart zu Eulenburg (died September 1915)